The Art Institutes (AI) are a collection of independently operated art schools in the United States. Since 2019, the schools have been owned by Education Principle Foundation (formerly known as Colbeck Foundation), a non-profit that also owns South University. The Art Institutes offer programs at the certificate, associate's, bachelors, and master's levels. The Art Institutes have faced accreditation and legal issues and student loan debtors have appealed to the US Department of Education for debt cancellation through defense to repayment claims. These efforts are premised on allegations they were defrauded. The student debt group "I Am Ai" has acted as a support group for students and former students of the Art Institutes, offering advice about debt cancellation.

History

Origins and growth (1921-2010)
The Art Institutes system was created in 1969 when Education Management Corporation (EDMC) acquired The Art Institute of Pittsburgh, which was founded in 1921. Starting in 2000, The Art Institutes began offering bachelor's degrees and, in 2001, launched its distance education program, Art Institute Online, which began offering bachelor's and non-degree programs online. The Art Institutes expanded through the acquisition of existing art colleges and the establishment of new Art Institutes. In 2001, there were around 20 campuses of The Art Institutes; this grew to approximately 30 locations in 2006 when the school's parent company was acquired by Goldman Sachs,Providence Equity Partners, and Leeds Equity Partners In 2009, EDMC became a publicly traded corporation, reaching 50 Art Institutes in 2010.

Scandal and decline (2011–present)

In 2011, Frontline released a documentary titled Educating Sergeant Pantzke. In the documentary, Iraq war veteran Chris Pantzke discussed the lack of disability services at the school. According to Pantzke, "Being a soldier, you don't want to quit, you don't want to give up or fail." After doing his own research, Pantzke concluded that the degree he was pursuing wasn't "worth much more than the paper is worth," and felt he was "throwing away taxpayer money" by using GI Bill funds.

In 2012, The Art Institute schools began to experience a decrease in the number of new students enrolling, seeing enrollment numbers drop by approximately 20 percent between the second quarter of the 2012 fiscal year and the start of 2013. EDMC attributed the drop in enrollment to limited access to Parent Loan for Undergraduate Students and the economic recession. In February 2013, EDMC announced plans for a three-year-old tuition freeze at The Art Institutes. Under this plan, the company pledged to maintain the current cost of tuition through 2015.

In June 2013, EDMC announced that its President John Mazzoni would resign effective July 14, 2013, after 27 years at the organization. Charles Restivo, Group Vice President, became the Interim President of The Art Institutes. In 2014, the US Department of Education reported that ten EDMC campuses, including several Art Institutes, were placed under heightened cash monitoring. The Art Institute of Pittsburgh was one of the schools listed.

In 2014, an investigation by the City Attorney of San Francisco's office led to a $4.4 million settlement. The city claimed AI used deceptive marketing tactics resulting in underestimated program costs for students and inflated job placement figures for graduates.

In May 2015, EDMC announced that it was closing 15 of the Art Institute locations. "A total of 5,432 students are enrolled among the campuses that are slated to close, according to a list provided by EDMC. The company will undergo a teach out process at each location, meaning each campus will continue to offer courses, student services and placement assistance until the last student has graduated, according to Hardman." Campuses slated to close included those in Atlanta, New York City, Ohio, Texas and Pennsylvania. In January 2016, EDMC announced that additional Art Institutes were ceasing enrollments. These campuses are The Art Institute of California – Los Angeles, The Art Institute of St. Louis, and the Art Institute of Tucson. At least 200 additional employees were laid off in May 2016. In June 2016, EDMC announced that the Art Institutes International Minnesota were ceasing enrollments. That meant a total of 19 Art Institute campuses were scheduled to close.

In June 2016, Tim Moscato, chief operating officer at the Art Institutes, resigned amid more downsizing. The same month, the US Department of Education voted to end Accrediting Council for Independent Colleges and Schools (ACICS) power to accredit. ACICS was stripped of its power to accredit in September. As of June 1, 2016, twelve Art Institute campuses were under heightened cash monitoring (or HCM1) by the US Department of Education because colleges are required to hold a certain amount of money to meet obligations in case the school closes prematurely. Campuses affected were Pittsburgh, Portland, Philadelphia, Atlanta, Fort Lauderdale, Minnesota, Colorado, Houston, Seattle, New York City, York, and Phoenix. In December 2016, nine additional Art Institutes (The Art Institute of Atlanta, The Art Institute of Houston, Miami International University of Art and Design) and their branch campuses in Charleston, Nashville, Arlington, Virginia Beach, Austin and San Antonio were placed on probation by their accreditor, Southern Association of Colleges and Schools (SACS).

In January 2018, Art Institutes locations in Novi and Denver and the Illinois Institute of Art locations in Chicago and Schaumburg lost their accreditation with the Higher Learning Commission. They did not inform students about the loss of accreditation until June despite being required to disclose this at the time of the loss. In 2018, Dream Center Education Holdings reported that more AI campuses were closing. In December 2018, 23 Art Institutes were closed.

In January 2019, The Washington Student Achievement Council suspended AI-Seattle's license to operate, which blocks enrollment of new students. The council will reinstate the license when Dream Center Education Holdings shows that it has "regained financial solvency or completed a viable reorganization." AI Las Vegas also received a show cause notice from ACICS requesting that the school provide information showing why it should not lose its accreditation.

In 2019, reports from DCEH's monitor, Marc Dottore, indicated that $9–13 million of federal funds, meant for students stipends, was missing. According to the Pittsburgh Post-Gazette, the monitor is "nearly out of cash to manage the entities he's tasked to oversee." Dottore has written to the Department of Education that Studio Enterprise, a company designated to service former and current DCEH schools, is taking service fees from the deal without providing any services, draining badly-needed cash from the operation. Information about the Education Principle Foundation is limited, but it appears to be formerly known as the Colbeck Foundation. According to the Republic Report, the Colbeck Foundation has ties to Studio Enterprise.

In February 2019, a federal court-appointed receiver halted Dream Center Education Holdings' plans to close the Art Institute of Pittsburgh on March 31, 2019.

In March 2019, teachers and other staff had not been paid their final pay checks. As many as 13 Art Institute campuses remained open in 2019, with the remaining schools facing financial struggles.

Schools and programs

The Art Institutes offer degree programs at the associate's, bachelor's and master's levels, as well as non-degree diploma programs. Areas of study include graphic design, media arts and animation, culinary arts, photography, digital filmmaking and video production, interior design, audio production, fashion design, game art and design, baking and pastry, and fashion marketing.

Ownership changes 
The Art Institutes' former parent company, Education Management Corporation (EDMC), was headquartered in Pittsburgh, Pennsylvania.

EDMC's initial public offering (IPO) was in 2009. Todd S. Nelson, who was previously the CEO of Apollo Education Group, became an EDMC board member in 2007 and the Chairman of the Board of Directors in 2012.

In November 2014, EDMC was delisted from the NASDAQ amid financial difficulties, lawsuits, and investigations and its stock was valued at less than one cent per share.

In 2016, Politico reported that an Indian company might be buying the Art Institute of New York City and NEIA.

In 2017, Education Management Corporation reported that it had sold the existing Art Institutes to The Dream Center Foundation, a Los Angeles-based Pentecostal organization. The sale was complete in October 2017. In July 2017, an accrediting agency, Middle States Association, rejected the sale of the Pittsburgh and Philadelphia Art Institutes to the Dream Center Foundation.

In January 2019, DCEH chairman Randall Barton stated that the Art Institutes, excluding the Art Institute of Pittsburgh, Art Institute of Las Vegas and Argosy University campuses, have been transferred to the Education Principle Foundation. Also in January 2019, Dream Center Education Holdings announced that AI schools, excluding AI Pittsburgh, AI Las Vegas, and Argosy campuses, had been transferred to the Education Principle Foundation with help from the US Department of Education. Inside Higher Ed described Education Principle Foundation as "a Delaware nonprofit with no annual budget and almost no internet presence", and linked it to private equity firm Colbeck Capital Management. Studio Enterprise, a Los Angeles company tied to Colbeck Capital Management, was also involved in the ownership transfer.

Art Institute students from closed schools were directed to DCEH's partner institutions and other for-profit colleges: DeVry University, Walden University, and Trident University.

According to the Republic Report, the court appointed receiver, Studio Enterprise & South University had until April 11, 2019 to negotiate to separate both South University schools and the remaining Art Institute schools from the Dream Center Education IT Platform by September 11, 2019. "Should they fail to agree, the plan of reorganization will likely fail, thereby dooming South University and the Art Institutes".

Locations
AI Miami International University of Art and Design in Miami and Tampa, Florida (934 students)
Art Institute of Atlanta (586 students)
Art Institute of Austin (130 students)
Art Institute of Houston (386 students)
Art Institute of San Antonio (249 students)
Art Institute of Virginia Beach (122 students)
Miami International University of Art & Design-Art Institute of Dallas (331 students)

Closed or sold campuses

The Art Institute of Atlanta – Decatur
 The Art Institute of California – Hollywood
The Art Institute of California – Inland Empire
The Art Institute of California – Los Angeles
The Art Institute of California – Orange County
The Art Institute of California – San Diego 
The Art Institute of California – San Francisco
The Art Institute of California – Sacramento
The Art Institute of California – Silicon Valley
The Art Institute of Charlotte
The Art Institute of Charleston
The Art Institute of Colorado
The Art Institute of Fort Lauderdale
The Art Institute of Indianapolis 
The Art Institutes International Minnesota 
 The Art Institute of Las Vegas 
The Art Institute of Michigan
The Art Institute of Philadelphia
The Art Institute of Phoenix
 The Art Institute of Pittsburgh
 The Art Institute of Pittsburgh – Online Division
The Art Institute of Portland
The Art Institute of Raleigh–Durham
The Art Institute of St. Louis
The Art Institute of Seattle
The Art Institute of Salt Lake City
The Art Institute of Tennessee – Nashville
The Art Institute of Toronto
The Art Institute of Tucson
The Art Institutes of Wisconsin
The Art Institute of Fort Worth
The Art Institute of Houston—North
The Art Institutes International – Kansas City
The Art Institute of Jacksonville
The Art Institute of Michigan – Troy
The Art Institute of New York City
The Art Institute of Ohio – Cincinnati
The Art Institute of Vancouver
The Art Institute of Washington- Dulles
The Art Institute of Washington
The Art Institute of York – Pennsylvania
Illinois Institute of Art – Chicago
Illinois Institute of Art – Schaumburg 
Illinois Institute of Art – Tinley Park
New England Institute of Art

Litigation
Between 2000 and 2018, the Art Institutes parent company EDMC was subject to numerous lawsuits from former students, former faculty, and government agencies. Thousands of former students of the Art Institutes claim they have been deceived and misled by the schools and their recruiters and have filed claims with the US Department of Education. Art Institute students are able to file defense to repayment claims with the US Department of Education.

In October 2000, EDMC announced the settlement of a lawsuit brought by a group of approximately 350 former students of The Art Institute of Houston.

From 2011 to 2015, EDMC was involved in a United States Department of Justice investigation and lawsuit alleging both illegal recruitment practices by EDMC schools, including The Art Institutes, and fraudulent receipt of $11 billion in federal and state financial aid money. A 2011 US DOJ report claimed EDMC "created a 'boiler room' style sales culture and has made recruiting and enrolling new students the sole focus of its compensation system."

In May 2013, a federal judge in Pennsylvania rejected a bid to dismiss a lawsuit against EDMC by a former EDMC employee. The lawsuit alleges that the corporation and its affiliates engaged in a scheme to maximize profits from financial aid programs administered by the U.S. Department of Education. The complainant in the case, Jason Sobek, who worked as an admissions director for EDMC in Pittsburgh from June 2008 through November 2010, alleges that the firm falsified information given to the Department of Education that indicated they were in compliance with the loan programs' eligibility requirements. In testimony that provided the basis for the lower court's decision last October, Sobek alleged that EDMC operated a "carefully crafted and widespread for-profit education scheme [in which] defendants have defrauded the United States and its taxpayers out of millions of dollars in the form of federally backed student loans and grants."

In November 2015, EDMC agreed to pay $95.5 million to settle claims of illegal recruiting, and consumer fraud.

In April 2016, two former AI teachers filed suit in Alameda City Superior Court claiming EDMC did not pay them a minimum wage or provide adequate rest periods, in order "to reduce compensation and increase its own profits." On September 8, 2016, Art Institutes students known as "I Am Ai" presented a notice to the Director of New England Institute of Art (NEIA) about a lawsuit that would be coming in 30 days. The lawsuit is being written by the Legal Services Center of Harvard Law School. On September 24, 2016, the Attorney General of Massachusetts expressed concern that the teaching duties at NEIA were being taken over by an unlicensed Indian company with no background in teaching US art students. The AG's Office stated that if a proper education for NEIA students could not be ensured, that NEIA should shut down at the end of the 2016. In December 2016, nine additional Art Institutes were placed on probation by their accreditor, Southern Association of Colleges and Schools (SACS).

On July 6, 2017, two former Art Institute students filed a lawsuit against Secretary of Education Betsy DeVos for illegally delaying rules intended to protect borrowers' rights. They were represented by the Project on Predatory Student Lending and Public Citizen in two lawsuits. This lawsuit helped clear the way for 2016 Borrower Defense Rule to take effect.

In 2018, Dream Center Education Holdings took control of the remaining 31 Art Institutes schools. In December 2018, Art Institute students filed a lawsuit in the Circuit Court of Cook County, claiming that Dream Center Educational Holdings failed to notify students it had lost institutional accreditation at four Illinois AI campuses.

Student outcomes
According to the College Scorecard, the Art Institute of Atlanta has a 20 percent graduation rate, a median student loan debt ranging from $16,500 (Culinary Arts) to $42,549 (AV Communication Technologies), and a median salary after attending of $19,000 (BFA) to $35,000 (BS in Computer Software).  Two years after entering repayment, 9 percent were making progress in their student loans.

Notable alumni 
 Kelvin Tan, 3D game art designer at Blizzard Entertainment
 Toli Carter, technical game art designer at Riot Games
 David Ruiz, video game designer at High Moon Studios
 Philip Donahue, Unreal Authorized Instructor Partner at Epic Games
 Roxana Bracamontes, 3D game art designer at Infinity Ward
 Matthew Evans (also known as Matt Evans), 3D game art designer at Infinity Ward
 Tyrone Evans Clark, video game designer, filmmaker, actor, and musician
 Ryan Benno, 3D game art designer at Insomniac Games
 Aaron P. Jessie (also known as Aaron Jessie), 3D game art designer at Thatgamecompany, worked on Journey (2012 video game)
 Ruben Morales, 3D game art designer at Sony Computer Entertainment America, worked on God of War Ragnarök

References

External links
Official website
Frontline: "Educating Sergeant Pantze"

 
Education companies established in 1969
Graphic design schools in the United States
Art schools in the United States
Cooking schools in the United States
Educational institutions established in 1969
1969 establishments in Pennsylvania